The Physical World is the second studio album by Canadian rock duo Death from Above (then known as Death from Above 1979). It was released September 9, 2014, through Last Gang Records. The album was produced by Dave Sardy who has previously worked with artists such as Oasis, Red Hot Chili Peppers, LCD Soundsystem, and Nine Inch Nails.

History
The album was announced on June 11, 2014. The first single, "Trainwreck 1979", about the 1979 Mississauga train derailment, was released on July 8, and the second single, "Government Trash", was released on August 14. "Trainwreck 1979" impacted radio on August 5, 2014.

The album was a long-listed nominee for the 2015 Polaris Music Prize. It was named Rock Album of the Year for 2015 at the Juno Awards.

Track listing

Personnel
Death From Above 1979
 Jesse F. Keeler – bass, synthesizer, songwriting
 Sebastien Grainger – drums, vocals, songwriting

Additional personnel
 Dave Sardy – production, mixing recording
 Andy Brohard – engineering
 Cameron Barton – engineering
 Ryan Castle – engineering
 Show Group – design
 Eva Michon – photography
 Dennis Chow – "tattoo flash"

Charts

References

Death from Above 1979 albums
Albums produced by Dave Sardy
2014 albums
Last Gang Records albums
Warner Records albums
Juno Award for Rock Album of the Year albums